Teen Wolf is an American television series that aired on MTV. The series premiered on Sunday, June 5, 2011, following the 2011 MTV Movie Awards. Teen Wolf is a supernatural drama series that follows Scott McCall (Tyler Posey), a high school student and social outcast who is bitten by a werewolf. He tries to maintain a normal life while hiding his secret and dealing with supernatural dangers that plague the town of Beacon Hills. He is aided by his best friend, Stiles Stilinski (Dylan O'Brien), and mysterious werewolf Derek Hale (Tyler Hoechlin).

Casting announcements were made in December, 2010, with the rest of the main cast being Crystal Reed, Holland Roden and Colton Haynes playing Allison Argent, Lydia Martin and Jackson Whittemore respectively. Haynes left the series after the second season to work on Arrow. He returned in the second part of the sixth season as a guest star. Reed followed, leaving after the third season to pursue other projects. She returned to guest star in the second part of Season 5 and played one of Allison's ancestors. Arden Cho, Shelley Hennig, and Dylan Sprayberry joined the cast for Seasons 4 and 5. Tyler Hoechlin left the series after the fourth season. Hoechlin later returned to the show in the second part of the sixth season in a guest capacity. On April 11, 2016, Arden Cho announced that she would not be returning for Season 6. After appearing in a recurring capacity in the first five seasons, Linden Ashby, Melissa Ponzio and JR Bourne were all upgraded to series regulars for the final season, and Dylan O'Brien got moved to a guest character due to his real life accident.

In February 2022, Paramount+ confirmed that the revival film's cast will consist of Tyler Posey, Holland Roden, Crystal Reed, Colton Haynes, Linden Ashby, Melissa Ponzio, J.R. Bourne, Shelley Hennig, Dylan Sprayberry, Orny Adams, Seth Gilliam and Ryan Kelley. In May 2022, Tyler Hoechlin was confirmed to be cast in the film.

Overview 
Legend
 = Main cast (credited)
 = Starring (starring cast in film)
 = Recurring cast (actor appears in three or more episodes that season)
 = Guest cast (actor appears in two or fewer episodes that season)

Main characters

Scott McCall

Allison Argent

Stiles Stilinski

Derek Hale

Lydia Martin

Jackson Whittemore

The Nogitsune

Malia Tate

Kira Yukimura

Liam Dunbar

Noah Stilinski

Melissa McCall

Chris Argent

Secondary characters

References

External links
 Eonline.com

Teen Wolf
Teen Wolf
Teen Wolf (2011 TV series)